Honam Theological University and Seminary is a private university located in Gwangju, South Korea. The university was established in the year 1955. with help from G. Thompson Brown.

Gallery

References

External links
 Official website

Nam District, Gwangju
Seminaries and theological colleges in South Korea
Universities and colleges in Gwangju
Educational institutions established in 1955
1955 establishments in South Korea